Bitara, or Berinomo, is a Sepik language spoken in East Sepik Province, Papua-New Guinea.

It is spoken in Bitara and Kagiru villages of Tunap/Hunstein Rural LLG, East Sepik Province.

References

Bahinemo languages
Languages of East Sepik Province